Orlando Garcia may refer to:

 Orlando Jacinto Garcia (born 1954), Cuban American composer of contemporary classical music
 Orlando Luis Garcia (born 1952), United States district court judge
 Orlando García (footballer) (born 1995), Mexican footballer